The Cabinet of the Dominican Republic is chosen by the President of the Republic and can be removed by the president at any time. The cabinet ministers were known as Secretaries of State until 26 January 2010 with the proclamation of the new Constitution.

Current Cabinet
Luis Abinader won the Presidency in the 5 July 2020 election. From his inauguration on 16 August 2020 cabinet will be fully renewed for the first time since 2004, however some members of the 2000-2004 administration cabinet will return to a first level office.

These are the current ministers of the cabinet:

See also
 Congress of the Dominican Republic
 Luis Abinader

References
Presidencia de la República Dominicana 

 
Government of the Dominican Republic
Dominican Republic